Karamjit Anmol is an Indian actor, comedian, singer and film producer active in the Punjabi entertainment industry. He has worked in Punjabi movies including Laavaan Phere and Carry on Jatta 2. He has also acted in the comedy plays "OMG !! Oh My God" and "Naughty Baba In Town" which were staged in Canada, America, New Zealand and Australia. He received the "PTC Best Comedian Of The Year" award in 2017 for Main Teri Tu Mera. Karamjit Anmol is nephew of great punjabi folk singer Kuldeep Manak. Manak sahab is his maternal uncle.

Discography (film soundtracks)

Filmography

Awards and nominations

Productions

Music albums

Single and duet tracks

References

External links

Living people
Indian male voice actors
Punjabi people
21st-century Indian male actors
Male actors in Punjabi cinema
Indian male comedians
Bhangra (music) musicians
1972 births